Mykhailo Ivanytsia (born 8 August 1960) is a Ukrainian professional football manager and former Soviet player.

Biography
Mykhailo Ivanytsia was born in a village Stavne, Velykyi Bereznyi Raion. His football career he began for a village team "Verkhovyna" and later was invited to a sports school in Uzhhorod.

In 1979 the head coach of FC Zakarpattia Uzhhorod Istvan Sandor invited Ivanytsia to the team of masters in the main squad. In 1980 Ivanytsia was drafted to armed forces as part of compulsory military service in the Soviet Union and served in the sports company in Lviv, but later returned to the club. In 1982 he moved to FC Frunzenets Sumy and already in Sumy Ivanytsia enrolled in a local economic faculty of the Sumy Institute of National Economy. Soon again he returned to Zakarpattia. In 1985 to 1988 he played for FC Zirka Kirovohrad.

Due to injuries, Ivanytsia retired and accepted the offer to lead the "Trudovi Rezervy" sports school in Uzhhorod. In 1992 the head coach of Zakarpattia Yuriy Chyrkov invited him as an assistant back to the club and where until 2013 Ivanytsia stayed performing various coaching functions including the club's head coach. During that time along with Yuriy Kalitvintsev and Viktor Ryashko led the club to promotions to the Ukrainian Premier League including the 2008–09 season during which Ivanytsia performed as the head coach.

On 10 July 2020 Ivanytsia became a head coach of Hungarian amateur club Torpo.

Honours and achievements
 Zakarpattia Uzhhorod
 Ukrainian First League: 2008–09

Notes

References

External links
 

1960 births
Living people
Soviet footballers
Association football midfielders
FC Hoverla Uzhhorod players
FC Frunzenets-Liha-99 Sumy players
FC Zirka Kropyvnytskyi players
Ukrainian football managers
FC Hoverla Uzhhorod managers
FC Mynai managers
FC Uzhhorod managers
Sportspeople from Zakarpattia Oblast